Hugh Burns may refer to:-

Hugh Burns, (born, 1965) Scottish footballer
Hugh Burns (footballer, born 1894), (1894–1963) Scottish footballer, also known as Jock Burns
Hugh Burns (musician), London-based Scottish guitarist